Bani Kinanah Department is one of the nine departments that constitute the Irbid Governorate of Jordan.
It has a population of over 100,000. Its administrative center is in Sama al-Rousan. 
There are five municipal councils in the department, and many educational, and service institutions. The department is served by the Yarmouk Hospital.

Geography

The Bani Kinanah Department is situated in the north-western edge of Jordan over looking the Sea of  Galilee. It is one of the nine departments of Irbid Governorate. 

Irbid Governorate